Haenschia is a genus of clearwing (ithomiine) butterflies, named by Lamas in 2004. They are in the brush-footed butterfly family, Nymphalidae. The name honours German entomologist and insect dealer Richard Haensch.

Species
Arranged alphabetically:
Haenschia derama (Haensch, 1905)
Haenschia sidonia (Haensch, 1905)

References 

Ithomiini
Nymphalidae of South America
Nymphalidae genera